Lithophane semibrunnea, the tawny pinion, is a moth of the Noctuoidea family. It is found in scattered populations in North Africa, central and southern Europe and Asia Minor.

Technical description and variation

The wingspan is 40–44 mm. Forewing dull wood brown, the inner-marginal half suffused with black brown, blackest on inner margin and in outer half of submedian interspace; veins marked with black scales; lines indistinct; the outer marked by pairs of black dots on veins and a white crescent on submedian fold; the submarginal line by a slighter one; hindwing greyish brown, paler in male, with the terminal
area darker.

Biology
The moth flies in late autumn.

Larva green; dorsal and subdorsal lines white; spiracular line broad, yellowish white, much varied with white dots and streaks below; head greenish; feeding on ash and other trees. The larvae mainly feed on Fraxinus excelsior.

References

External links

Tawny pinion at UKmoths
Fauna Europaea
Lepiforum.de
Vlindernet.nl 

semibrunnea
Moths of Europe
Moths of Asia
Moths of the Middle East
Moths described in 1809
Taxa named by Adrian Hardy Haworth